Frank Pietri (born Francisco Pietri in Ponce, Puerto Rico, July 6, 1934—March 26, 2020) was an American Jazz Instructor, choreographer, and performer in New York City.

History
As an international performer, director, choreographer, and teacher, Mr. Pietri’s career spanned more than four decades. A protégé of Matt Mattox, he appeared as a member of the original casts of numerous Broadway musicals, including Ballroom, Seesaw, and Promises, Promises, choreographed by Michael Bennett, I Remember Mama, Golden Rainbow, What Makes Sammy Run?, Nowhere To Go But Up, Wildcat, and Destry Rides Again. Mr. Pietri choreographed, directed, and appeared in television shows, nightclub acts, industrials, cruise ships, and films, including Woody Allen's Everyone Says I Love You.

He worked with such notables as Lucille Ball, Steve Lawrence, Eydie Gormé, Liv Ullmann, Andy Griffith, Jerry Orbach, Tommy Tune, Michele Lee, Woody Allen, Robin Williams and others. Mr. Pietri was on faculty at Matt Mattox School, Morelli School of Dance, Ballet Hispanico School, Peridance Center, Joe Davis Dance Center, Joyce Trisler Dance Studio, Dance Concepts, Inc., Marymount College and New Dance Group Arts Center. As a guest teacher, Mr. Pietri took his Free-Style Jazz Technique throughout the U.S. and Europe. He taught at New Dance Group until its closure in February 2009, and also taught at Roy Arias studios in New York City.

References

External links
 
 

American male musical theatre actors
American choreographers
Singers from New York City
Place of birth missing
1934 births
2020 deaths